Events from the year 1244 in Ireland.

Incumbent
Lord: Henry III

Births

Deaths
 Donnchadh Mór Ó Dálaigh, poet